is a local history museum located in the city of  Wakayama, Wakayama Prefecture, Japan. It opened in November 1985 to commemorate the 400th anniversary of the construction of Wakayama Castle. The facility is adjacent to the Wakayama Civic Library. In the permanent exhibition room, there are exhibits related to the cultural history of Wakayama city from the prehistoric period through the postwar reconstruction period, as well as many materials pertaining to the Kishū Tokugawa clan, who ruled as daimyō of Kishū Domain under the Edo Period Tokugawa Shogunate.

See also
 Wakayama Prefectural Museum

References

External links

 Wakayama City Museum 

Museums in Wakayama Prefecture
Wakayama (city)
History museums in Japan
Museums established in 1985
1985 establishments in Japan